Ulrich Ochsenbein (24 November 1811, in Unterlangenegg – 3 November 1890) was a Swiss politician and member of the Swiss Federal Council (1848–1854).

Professional life
He studied law and from 1835 he had a law firm together with his brother-in-law Eduard Sury. He headed the Radicals of Bern (Berner Radikale) together with Jakob Stämpfli. The Radicals later became the Free Democratic Party.

Political career
Ulrich Ochsenbein participated in the Freischarenzüge against Catholic Lucerne in 1844 and 1845. He was a member of the Grand Council in the canton of Bern from 1845 to 1846, president of the Verfassungsrat in 1846 and a member of the Regierungsrat from 1846 to 1848. 1847 to 1848 he represented the canton of Bern at the Tagsatzung (diet) which he presided in 1847. He played an important role that the Swiss constitution was accepted by the Swiss population in the constitutional referendum held on 6 June 1848.

He was elected to the Federal Council of Switzerland on 16 November 1848 and handed over office on 31 December 1854. In the so-called Complementary Elections to the National Council in 1854, he had lost to Jakob Stämpfli, who then was preferred for the Federal Council by the National Council. He is one of only a few federal councilors to be voted out of office. During his time as a federal councilor a fight broke out between the conservatives and a group of the radical party. Not willing to take positions, he lost the trust of both sides. During his time in office he held the Military Department (department of defence).

References

External links

All of the following links are in German.
 
 http://www.zuerich98.ch/woche42_l02.html
 https://web.archive.org/web/20031211042117/http://www.stub.unibe.ch/extern/hv/gkb/ii/zwei.html

1811 births
1890 deaths
People from Thun District
Swiss Calvinist and Reformed Christians
Free Democratic Party of Switzerland politicians
Members of the Federal Council (Switzerland)
Presidents of the National Council (Switzerland)
Members of the National Council (Switzerland)
Swiss military officers